TruthFinder is an American personal information search website based in San Diego, California.

History
TruthFinder was founded in March 2015 in San Diego, California by Kris Kibak and Joey Rocco.

In December 2021, TechRadar reviewed TruthFinder.

TruthFinder provides information related to people for background checks and reverse address lookup. The website also provides an option to opt-out.

References

Organizations based in California